Van Berkel is a Dutch toponymic surname indicating an origin in either Berkel, South Holland, Berkel, North Brabant, or a former hamlet now part of Horst, Limburg. The Berkel is also a river in Gelderland and North Rhine-Westphalia. A variant spelling is Van Berckel. Notable people with the surname include:

Ben van Berkel (born 1957), Dutch architect
Van Berkel en Bos Architectenbureau
Crescendo van Berkel (b. 1992), Dutch footballer 
Esther van Berkel (b. 1990), Dutch volleyball player
Gary J. Van Berkel (b. c. 1960), American chemist
 (b. 1986), Swiss/Dutch triathlete, brother of Martina
Klaas van Berkel (b. 1953), Dutch historian of science
Martina van Berkel (b. 1989), Swiss/Dutch swimmer, sister of Jan
Tim Van Berkel (b. 1984), Australian triathlete
 (1869-1952), Dutch inventor of the Berkel meat slicer and aircraft manufacturer
Van Berkel W-A, 1920s fighter floatplane
Van Berkel W-B, 1920s long range reconnaissance seaplane
Van Berckel
Engelbert François van Berckel (1726–1796), Dutch politician
Nol van Berckel (1890–1973), Dutch footballer and judge
Pieter Johan van Berckel (1725–1800), Dutch mayor of Rotterdam and first Dutch ambassador to the United States of America

References

Dutch-language surnames
Surnames of Dutch origin
Toponymic surnames